Tena Nemet Brankov (born 4 January 1994) is a Croatian actress.

Biography
Brankov was born on 4 January 1994 in Zagreb, the only daughter of actors Slavko Brankov and Marina Nemet. She had to move out of the family home in 2012, because the City of Zagreb demanded that she return the 55-square-meter apartment that was given to her parents for use. After graduating from Tituš Brezovacki High School in Zagreb, she graduated from the Academy of Dramatic Art in 2017. Brankov had her first film role in the drama "The Trampoline", for which she won the Golden Arena for Best Supporting Actress at the Pula Film Festival in 2016, and her first theater role in the drama "Fine mrtve đjevje" at the end of 2014.

Filmography

Film 
 "General" as Jelica (2019)
 "Trampolin" as Nika (2016)
 "Djevojke" (short film) as Tena (2016)
 "Ljubav ili smrt" as Lotte (2014)

Television 
 "Kumovi" as Valentina (2022)
 "Šutnja" as Goga (2021)
 "General" as Jelica (2019)
 "Ko te šiša" as mlada Marie (2017)
 "Počivali u miru" kao Buga Koretić (2017)
 "Novine" as Lara Tomašević (2016–2020)
 "Crno-bijeli svijet" as Selma (2016)
 "Nemoj nikome reći" as Iva Tarle (2015–2017)
 "Operacija Kajman" as Sanja (2007)

Stage 
 "UglyDolls" as Tuesday (2019)
 "Hugo i lovci na duhove" as Lola Thompson (2016)

Radio 
 "Jesenja lica" (2019)

References

External links

1994 births
Living people
Actresses from Zagreb
Croatian film actresses
Croatian stage actresses
Croatian television actresses
21st-century Croatian actresses